Roby may refer to:

Places
Roby, Merseyside
Roby, Texas
Roby, Poland

People with the surname
Courtney Roby, NFL wide receiver
Isaiah Roby, American basketball player
Lelia P. Roby (1848-1910), American philanthropist; founder, Ladies of the Grand Army of the Republic
Martha Roby, US representative from Alabama's 2nd congressional district
Peta Roby, Australian dancer and choreographer
Reggie Roby, NFL punter
Roby Lakatos, Romani violinist
John Roby (1793-1850), English banker, writer, and poet
Henry John Roby (1830-1915), English classical scholar

See also
North Roby, Texas - ghost town
Robey